The 1992–93 Kansas Jayhawks men's basketball team represented the University of Kansas in the 1992–93 NCAA Division I men's basketball season, which was the Jayhawks' 95th basketball season. The head coach was Roy Williams, who served his 5th year at KU. The team played its home games in Allen Fieldhouse in Lawrence, Kansas. Kansas won the Big Eight regular season title and made the Final Four for the second time in three seasons.

Roster

Big Eight Conference standings

Schedule and results 

|-
!colspan=9 style=| Regular Season

|-

|-
!colspan=9 style=| Big Eight Tournament

|-
!colspan=9 style=| NCAA tournament

Rankings 

*There was no coaches poll in week 1.

See also 
 1993 NCAA Division I men's basketball tournament

References 

Kansas Jayhawks men's basketball seasons
Kansas
NCAA Division I men's basketball tournament Final Four seasons
Kansas
Jay
Jay